John D. Jones (1849–1914) was a Minnesota politician and Speaker of the Minnesota House of Representatives.

Jones was born in Pennsylvania.  First elected to the Minnesota House of Representatives in 1894, he served two terms, becoming speaker in 1897. In 1898, Jones successfully ran for a seat in the Minnesota Senate, where he served until 1902.

References

1849 births
1914 deaths
People from Pennsylvania
Republican Party members of the Minnesota House of Representatives
Republican Party Minnesota state senators
Speakers of the Minnesota House of Representatives
19th-century American politicians
People from Long Prairie, Minnesota
19th-century American lawyers